Hertha Haase (born 3 July 1941) is a German former swimmer. She competed in the women's 4 × 100 metre freestyle relay at the 1956 Summer Olympics.

References

1941 births
Living people
German female swimmers
Olympic swimmers of the United Team of Germany
Swimmers at the 1956 Summer Olympics
Place of birth missing (living people)